Robert F. Wilson (born 1944) is an American former professional basketball player. He played for the Dallas Chaparrals of the American Basketball Association (ABA) during the 1967–68 ABA season. He played in 69 games and averaged 8.9 points and 6.5 rebounds per game.

Wilson played collegiately at the University of Kansas in 1965–66 and half of the 1966–67 season before leaving the team mid-year due to academic ineligibility. He had transferred to Kansas from Western Michigan University.

References

1944 births
Living people
American men's basketball players
Basketball players from St. Louis
Dallas Chaparrals players
Kansas Jayhawks men's basketball players
Power forwards (basketball)
Western Michigan Broncos men's basketball players